"I Left My Wallet in El Segundo" is a song by American hip hop group A Tribe Called Quest, released as the debut single from their first album, People's Instinctive Travels and the Paths of Rhythm (1990). The song contains a sample of "Funky" by The Chambers Brothers as the main hook.

Critical reception
James Hamilton from Record Mirror felt that "this mildly amusing story telling slow rap was always at times raggamuffin accented amidst the Mexican colouring of its subject matter, and is more so than ever now that it's out here again in Norman Cook's brand new bassily booming Vampire Mix (bpm)".

Tracklist

Original version
 7" single
 "Pubic Enemy" (Radio) (3:45)
 "I Left My Wallet in El Segundo" (Radio) (4:11)

 12" and cassette single
 "I Left My Wallet in El Segundo" (Feature Length) (5:05)
 "I Left My Wallet in El Segundo" (Talkie) (4:10)
 "I Left My Wallet in El Segundo" (Silent) (4:08)
 "Pubic Enemy" (Saturday Night Virus Discomix) (4:16)
 "Pubic Enemy" (Talkie) (3:45)
 "Pubic Enemy" (Silent) (3:46)

 12" promo
 "I Left My Wallet in El Segundo" (Extended) (5:05)
 "I Left My Wallet in El Segundo" (Radio) (4:10)
 "I Left My Wallet in El Segundo" (Instrumental) (4:08)
 "Pubic Enemy" (Extended) (4:16)
 "Pubic Enemy" (Radio) (3:45)
 "Pubic Enemy" (Instrumental) (3:46)

 UK 12" maxi
 "Pubic Enemy" (Saturday Night Virus Disco Mix) (4:16)
 "I Left My Wallet in El Segundo" (Extended) (4:35)
 "Pubic Enemy" (Silent) (3:46)
 "I Left My Wallet in El Segundo" (Silent) (4:07)
 "I Left My Wallet in El Segundo" (Excerpt) (0:32)

 UK CD maxi
 "Pubic Enemy (Radio Version) (3:49)
 "I Left My Wallet in El Segundo" (Radio) (4:13)
 "I Left My Wallet in El Segundo" (Excerpt) (0:33)
 "Pubic Enemy" (Extended) (4:17)
 "I Left My Wallet in El Segundo" (Extended) (4:35)

 CD promo
 "I Left My Wallet in El Segundo" (Radio) (4:10)
 "I Left My Wallet in El Segundo" (Extended) (4:35)
 "I Left My Wallet in El Segundo" (Instrumental) (4:08)

Norman Cook remix
 7" and cassette single
 "I Left My Wallet in El Segundo" (3:42)
 "I Left My Wallet in El Segundo" (Talkie) (4:10)

 12" single
 "I Left My Wallet in El Segundo" (Vampire Mix) (5:54)
 "I Left My Wallet in El Segundo" (Talkie) (4:10)
 "I Left My Wallet in El Segundo" (Silent) (4:08)

 12" Independence version
 "I Left My Wallet in El Segundo" (Independence Mix) (5:38)
 "I Left My Wallet in El Segundo" (Drum Pan Mix) (5:52)

 CD single
 "I Left My Wallet in El Segundo" (3:42)
 "I Left My Wallet in El Segundo" (Vampire Mix) (5:54)
 "I Left My Wallet in El Segundo" (Talkie) (4:10)
 "I Left My Wallet in El Segundo" (Silent) (4:08)

Music video
The entire music video for "I Left My Wallet in El Segundo" is narrated. The group finds themselves at a police station where Q-Tip begins his story. The tale starts with Q-Tip's mother winning a game show prize and leaving on a month-long cruise trip. After her departure, Q-Tip calls Ali and they take a road trip across America in Q-Tip's mother's car. The group gets lost on the way and Q-Tip asks a four-foot person with a sombrero for directions. Then, at a nearby pub, Q-Tip is distracted by an attractive woman and forgets his wallet before they leave. The waitress then takes his wallet off the counter. They return home and Q-Tip drops off Ali. Only then does Q-Tip realize that his wallet is missing and he rounds up the group to get it back. When they get back to El Segundo, California they want to stay longer, and the video fades out.

Charts

References

External links
"I Left My Wallet in El Segundo" music video at YouTube
Lyrics

1990 songs
1990 debut singles
A Tribe Called Quest songs
Jive Records singles
Song recordings produced by Q-Tip (musician)
Songs written by Q-Tip (musician)
Fatboy Slim songs
Songs written by Ali Shaheed Muhammad
Songs about California